Levin (original Russian: Левин) is a surname with several word origins. It is a common Ashkenazi Jewish surname (Levine/Levin/Levi).

In the Jewish variant (a form of Levy) it is derivative of one of the 12 Jewish biblical tribes, the tribe of Levi, whose descendants the Levites had distinctive duties in the Temple period.

In the Russian variant, Levin comes from lev (лев) which means lion in Russian. It can also be pronounced Lyovin (Лёвин) which is a patronymic form of Лёва.

Other variations include Lavin, Lavine, Le Neve, Levene, Levi, Levina, Levine, Levitt, Levy, Lewin, Lieven, Levins and Levinson.

People with the name "Levin" (and Russian feminine variant Levina) include:

People

A–I
 A. Leo Levin (1919–2015), American law professor at the University of Pennsylvania Law School
 Adam K. Levin, former director of the New Jersey Division of Consumer Affairs and businessman in consumer credit-related businesses
 Adam Levin, fiction author
 Alan Levin (business), American businessmen, CFO of drug maker Pfizer
 Alan Levin (filmmaker) (1926–2006), American filmmaker and journalist
 Alan Levin (Internet governance), South African computer scientist and Internet activist
 Aleksandr Mitrofanovich Levin (1871–1929), Russian chess player
 Alter Levin (1883–1933), Hebrew writer and poet
 Andy Levin (born 1960), US Democratic Representative from Michigan; son of Sander and nephew of Carl
 Arnold Levin, New Yorker cartoonist
 Bengt Levin (1958–2020), Swedish orienteering competitor
 Benjamin Levin (born 1988), American record producer and songwriter known professionally as Benny Blanco
 Bernard Levin, (1928–2004), British writer and broadcaster
 Beth Levin (linguist), American linguist
 Beth Levin (musician), American pianist
 Bobby Levin, American bridge player
 Burton Levin (1930 – 2016), American diplomat, former Ambassador to Burma
 Camille Levin (born 1990), American soccer player
 Carl Levin (1934–2021), US Democratic Senator from Michigan; brother of Sander Levin, cousin of Charles Levin and uncle of Andy Levin
 Charles Levin (actor) (1949–2019), American actor
 Charles Levin (judge) (1926–2020), American jurist; cousin of Carl and Sander Levin
 Corey Levin (born 1994), American football player
 Daniel Levin (attorney) (active 2004–2005), Acting Assistant Attorney General for the Office of Legal Counsel of the U.S. Justice Department
 Daniel Levin (writer) (born ), American attorney and novelist
 David L. Levin (born 1949), American politician from Missouri
 David Levin (businessman) (born 1962), British businessman
 David Levin (born 1999), Israeli ice hockey player
 David Levin (singer), American singer-songwriter
 David N. Levin (1948–2017), American balloonist
 David P. Levin (born 1958), American producer, director, writer and editor
 Diane Levin (born 1947), American author and educator
 Diane Levin, American author and educator
 Eyal Levin (born 1986), Israeli Olympic sailor
 Ezra G. Levin, American lawyer
 Fred Levin (1937–2021), American lawyer
 Gabe Levin (born 1994), American-Israeli basketball player in the Israeli Basketball Premier League
 Gerald M. Levin (born 1939), American businessman with Time Warner
 Gilbert Levin, American engineer
 Hanoch Levin (1943–1999), Israeli writer and theater director
 Harold Levin, American violist, composer, and conductor
 Harry Levin (1912–1994), American literary critic
 Harvey Levin, TV and movie producer
 Hjördis Levin (born 1930), Swedish historian and author
 Ira Levin (1929–2007), American novelist, playwright and songwriter

J–Z
 Jack Levin, professor at Northeastern University and sociologist
 Janice H. Levin (1913–2001), American philanthropist and art collector from New York City
 Janna Levin, theoretical cosmologist
 Jennifer Levin (1968–1986), murder victim in New York City's Central Park
 Jill Levin (born 1961), American bridge player
 Joe Levin, American lawyer
 Jon Levin (born 1966), physicist
 Jonathan Levin, Mexican footballer
 Jonathan Levin (teacher) (1966–1997), American murder victim
 Josef Lhévinne (1874–1944), Russian pianist
 Kenneth Levin (born 1944), American psychiatrist and author
 Leonid Levin (born 1948), Russian-born computer scientist
 Lev Levin (1870–1938) Physician, born Odessa, executed during Stalin's purges
 Lewis Charles Levin (1808–1860), first Jewish Representative to the U.S. Congress
 Maks Levin (1981–2022), Ukrainian photojournalist killed in the 2022 Russian invasion of Ukraine
 Marc Levin, Jewish American filmmaker
 Mark Levin (director) (born 1966), American director and screenwriter
 Mark Levin (born 1957), American conservative radio host, lawyer, author, and political commentator who served in the Reagan administration
 Meyer Levin (1905–1981), U.S. novelist
 Michael Levin, professor of philosophy at the City University of New York
 Michael Levin (biologist), professor of biology at Tufts University
 Michael Graubart Levin (born 1958), American author
 Mike Levin (born 1978), California Democratic politician
 Murray Levin (1927–1999), political science professor at Boston University
 Nathaniel Levin (1818–1903), New Zealand businessman and politician
 Neil David Levin (1954–2001), former executive director of the Port Authority of New York and New Jersey who was killed in the September 11 attacks
 Nora Levin (1916–1989), American Holocaust historian
 Petra Levin, American microbiologist
 Philip J. Levin (c. 1909–1971), American real estate developer and investor
 Rick Levin (born 1947), American economist, president of Yale University
 Rob Levin (1955–2006), founder of the freenode IRC network
 Robert D. Levin (born 1947), U.S. composer and musicologist
 Robert Levin (Norwegian pianist) (1912–1996), Norwegian pianist and composer
 Robert Levin (writer) (born 1939), American fiction writer
 Sander M. Levin (born 1931), US Democratic Representative from Michigan; brother of Carl, cousin of Charles and father of Andy
 Savannah Levin (born 1995), American soccer player
 Simon A. Levin, theoretical ecologist, professor of biology at Princeton University
 Susan Bass Levin, New Jersey, US politician
 Tatyana Levina (born 1977), Russian sprinter
 Theodore Levin (1897–1970), U.S. federal jurist
 Tony Levin (born 1946), U.S. bass player
 Vladimir Levin, Russian mathematician and alleged criminal hacker
 Walter Levin (1924–2017), German-born violinist, founder member of the LaSalle Quartet
 William Levin (1845–1893), New Zealand businessman and politician
 Yariv Levin Israeli MK and former minister
 Yuval Levin, member of White House domestic policy staff
 Zara Levina (1906–1976), Ukrainian composer

Fictional characters
 Kevin Levin, protagonist/antagonist from the television series Ben 10"
 Konstantin Levin, a protagonist in Tolstoy's novel Anna Karenina
 Patti Levin, character in The Leftovers
 Jack Levin, a character in the racing video game series F-Zero

See also
 Lavine
 Levene
 Levi
 Levi (surname)
 Levin (given name)
 Levina
 Levine
 Lewin
 Lieven
 Lewinsky

References

Jewish surnames
Levite surnames
Yiddish-language surnames
Russian-Jewish surnames